Bogda Peak or Bogda Feng (cf.

Bogda Peak is a challenging climb due to its steep relief. Its sides slope at angles of between 70° and 80°. It was first climbed in 1981 by an 11-person team from Kyoto.

See also
List of Ultras of Central Asia

References

External links

Mountains of Xinjiang
Five-thousanders of the Tian Shan